The 2016–17 NACAM Formula 4 Championship season was the second season of the NACAM Formula 4 Championship. It began on 24 September 2016 at the Circuit of the Americas in Austin, Texas and ended on 18 June 2017 at the Autódromo Hermanos Rodríguez in Mexico City after eight triple-header rounds.

Teams and drivers

Race calendar and results

The calendar was published on 28 July 2015. For the first time, the series expanded outside Mexico, hosting its opening round at the Circuit of the Americas in Austin. The series also hosted a full-championship round in support of the 2016 Mexican GP round, as opposed to the exhibition round held the previous season, and also extended its territory to Southeastern Mexico by holding two back-to-back rounds in the states of Yucatán and Quintana Roo.

A mid-season revision of the calendar was made after the Southeastern events had taken place.

Championship standings

Points were awarded to the top 10 classified finishers in each race. For this season, the series changed its scoring system following the unified FIA F4 rulebook.

Drivers' Championship

Rookie Cup

See also
 Panam GP Series
 LATAM Challenge Series

References

External links 

  

NACAM Formula 4 Championship seasons
NACAM
NACAM
NACAM
NACAM
NACAM F4
NACAM F4